A seizure response dog (SRD) (also known as seizure dog) is a dog demonstrating specific assisting behaviour during or immediately after a person's epileptic seizure or other seizure. When reliably trained such dogs can serve as service dogs for people with epilepsy.

Tasks
Tasks for seizure dogs may include, but are not limited to:
 Find someone to help
 Activate an emergency response system
 Stimulate a person to help them "wake up" after a seizure
 Use body weight to keep the person in a specific position
 Act as a brace to help the person up
 Retrieve a phone or medication
 Physically remove the patient from an unsafe situation (i.e. middle of a street)

Seizure alert dog 
A dog demonstrating specific behaviour prior to a person's epileptic seizure is also referred to as seizure alert dog (SAD). Reports suggest that some dogs can be trained to anticipate epileptic seizures. However, this ability has been questioned.

Seizure response and seizure alerting behaviour may spontaneously develop  in dogs living with children and adults with epilepsy.

See also

References

External links
 Seizure-alert dogs National Geographic News article
 Canine Assistants Service Dog School - Specializing in the placement of Seizure Response dogs, and seizure scent research

Assistance dogs
Epilepsy